Horace Williams (24 November 1932 – 16 May 2011) was a Grenadian cricketer. He played in one List A and six first-class matches for the Windward Islands from 1960 to 1981.

See also
 List of Windward Islands first-class cricketers

References

External links
 

1932 births
2011 deaths
Grenadian cricketers
Windward Islands cricketers